Eugene F. Irschick is an American historian. He is a professor of history at the University of California, Berkeley since 1978.

Biography
Irschick, a 1951 graduate of the Kodaikanal School, earned his B.A. Honors in History with minor in Religion and Greek from Gettysburg College in 1955 and later a M.A. in South Asia Regional Studies from the University of Pennsylvania in 1959. He subsequently did his Ph.D. from the University of Chicago in 1964.

Works

References

Year of birth missing (living people)
Living people
21st-century American historians
21st-century American male writers
University of California, Berkeley College of Letters and Science faculty
Gettysburg College alumni
University of Pennsylvania alumni
University of Chicago alumni
Historians from California
American male non-fiction writers